The Main Attraction is an album by American jazz guitarist Grant Green featuring performances recorded in 1976 and released on the Kudu label.

Reception
The AllMusic review by Thom Jurek awarded the album two stars and stated "While it's true that this isn't one of Green's best records, it's not by any means his worst... Contrary to jazz critics' opinions, Green had nothing to be ashamed of on Main Attraction. If funky '70s soul-jazz is your thing, you won't go wrong with this one".

Track listing
 "The Main Attraction" (Don Grolnick, Steve Khan, Will Lee, David Matthews, Andy Newmark) - 19:35
 "Future Feature" (Matthews) - 7:47
 "Creature" (Grant Green) - 10:20
Recorded at Rudy Van Gelder Studio, Englewood Cliffs, New Jersey in March 1976 with additional recording at A&R Studios, NYC

Personnel
Grant Green - guitar
Burt Collins, Jon Faddis - trumpet
Sam Burtis - trombone
Hubert Laws - flute
Michael Brecker, Joe Farrell - tenor saxophone
Ronnie Cuber - baritone saxophone
Don Grolnick - electric piano, clavinet
Steve Khan - rhythm guitar
Will Lee - electric bass
Andy Newmark - drums
Carlos Charles - conga, percussion
Sue Evans - percussion
Dave Matthews - arranger, conductor

References

Kudu Records albums
Grant Green albums
1976 albums
Albums produced by Creed Taylor
Albums arranged by David Matthews (keyboardist)
Albums recorded at Van Gelder Studio